Walkers Creek is a  long 2nd order tributary to the Uwharrie River, in Randolph County, North Carolina.

Course
Walkers Creek rises in a pond on the Barnes Creek and Poison Fork divide about 5 miles northwest of Abner, North Carolina in Randolph County, North Carolina.  Walkers Creek flows north then curves southwest to meet the Uwharrie River about 4 miles east of Pinson.

Watershed
Walkers Creek drains  of area, receives about 47.3 in/year of precipitation, has a topographic wetness index of 338.54 and is about 77% forested.

See also
List of rivers of North Carolina

References

Rivers of North Carolina
Rivers of Randolph County, North Carolina